Saint Berthild, also known as Bertille or Bertilla (died 692), was abbess of Chelles Abbey in France.

Life
Berthild was born into one of the most illustrious families in the territory of Soissons, France, during the reign of Dagobert I.

She entered the nunnery of Jouarre in Brie, not far from Meaux, founded in 630 by Ado, the elder brother of Saint Ouen, who had taken the monastic habit there. Berthild was educated by Saint Thelchildis, the first abbess of Jouarre, who governed that abbey until 660.

When Saint Bathildis, the wife of Clovis II, founded the abbey of Chelles, which Saint Clotildis had first instituted near the Marne, she asked Saint Thelchildis to set up a new community there with the most experienced and virtuous nuns of Jouarre to direct the novices in the monastic order. Berthild was appointed first abbess of Chelles Abbey in 646.

Berthild was known for her devotion to self-denial. She "was ambitious of martyrdom, but as no persecutors were forthcoming, she martyred herself with austerities."

Saint Berthild's reputation drew several foreign princesses to the abbey. Among them was Queen Bathildis. After the death of her husband in 655, she was left regent of the kingdom during the minority of her son Clotaire III, but as soon as he was of age to govern in 665, she retired to Chelles Abbey. Saint Berthild died in 692 after governing the nunnery for forty-six years.

Notes and references

Bibliography
 

692 deaths
Frankish abbesses
Year of birth unknown
7th-century Frankish saints
Colombanian saints
7th-century Frankish nuns